Engineers Against Poverty (EAP) is a specialist British NGO working in the field of engineering and international development. It was established in 1998 by the Royal Academy of Engineering and the Department for International Development (DFID).

References

External links

Development charities based in the United Kingdom
Engineering organizations